Espino de la Orbada is a village and municipality in the province of Salamanca,  western Spain, part of the autonomous community of Castile and León.

Geography

The postal code is 37419.

References

Municipalities in the Province of Salamanca